The following are civil and military operators of the Embraer EMB 110 Bandeirante:

Civil operators

In August 2008 a total of 122 EMB 110 aircraft (all variants) were in airline service worldwide with some 45 airlines.  Major operators include:
 
 Aeropelican (1)
 King Island Airlines (1)
 
 Pineapple Air (1)
 
 Abaeté Linhas Aéreas (6)
 Manaus Aerotáxi
 Táxi Aéreo Weiss
 
 Aeropro (2)
 Kenn Borek Air (1)
 
 Air Rarotonga (3)
 
 Aerocaribbean (4)
 
 Insel Air (3) (Retired)
 
  Northern Air (Fiji)
 
  Transportes Aéreos Guatemaltecos (6)
 
 Aberdair Aviation (1)
 
 Air UK
 Genair
 Jersey European Airways
 SkyDrift Air Charter (1)
 
 CM Airlines(7)
 
 Ryanair (1)
 
 Aberdair Aviation (3)
 
 Teddy Air (1)
 
 Agape Flights (1)
 AirNow (9)
 Air Sunshine (2)
 Arctic Circle Air (3)
 Royal Air Freight (5)
 Special Aviation Systems (4)
 Tropical Air Transport (1)
 Wiggins Airways (7)
 
 Rutaca (5)
 
 Payam Air (5) (4 stored)

Historically, a number of commuter airlines in the U.S. and elsewhere operated the EMB 110 in scheduled passenger airline operations.

Military operators

 EMB 100
  Brazilian Air Force - former operator.
 EMB 110
  National Air Force of Angola
  Brazilian Air Force Operates 104 aircraft.
  Military of Cape Verde
  Chilean Navy Operates five aircraft.
  Colombian Air Force Operates two aircraft.
 
 
 Guyana Defence Force - former operator.
  Uruguayan Air Force Operates three aircraft.
 EMB 111
  National Air Force of Angola
  Argentine Navy - leased by naval aviation during the Falklands War
  Brazilian Air Force
  Chilean Navy
  Senegalese Air Force

References 

Embraer aircraft
EMB 110